AMC-3 (formerly GE-3) is a commercial broadcast communications satellite owned by SES World Skies, part of SES S.A. (and formerly GE Americom, then SES Americom). Launched on 4 September 1997, from Cape Canaveral, Florida, AMC-3 is a hybrid C-band / Ku-band satellite. It provides coverage to Canada, United States, Mexico, Caribbean. Located in a geostationary orbit parallel to the Yucatán Peninsula and Great Lakes, AMC-3 provides service to commercial and government customers, with programming distribution, satellite news gathering and broadcast internet capabilities.

Eagle-1 
In January 2017, the AMC-3 Ku-band payload was sold to Global Eagle Entertainment (GEE), a provider of satellite-based connectivity and media to mobility markets, such as passenger aircraft. GEE purchased all the capacity on the satellite to support aeronautical customers, in particular Southwest Airlines, the company's largest customer, and rebranded the satellite as Eagle-1. The satellite remains under the control of SES S.A.

NASA TV 
Among other satellite TV channels, AMC-3 carries NASA TV.

References

External links 
 AMC-3 at SES.com
 Global Eagle Entertainment website 
 
 
 

Communications satellites in geostationary orbit
Satellite television
Spacecraft launched in 1997
SES satellites
AMC-03